The concept of Cascadian bioregionalism is closely identified with the environmental movement. In the early 1970s, the contemporary vision of bioregionalism began to be formed through collaboration between natural scientists, social and environmental activists, artists and writers, community leaders, and back-to-the-landers who worked directly with natural resources. A bioregion is defined in terms of the unique overall pattern of natural characteristics that are found in a specific place. The main features are generally obvious throughout a continuous geographic terrain and include a particular climate, local aspects of seasons, landforms, watersheds, soils, and native plants and animals. People are also counted as an integral aspect of a locale's life, as can be seen in the ecologically adaptive cultures of early inhabitants, and in the activities of present-day reinhabitants who attempt to harmonize in a sustainable way with the place where they live.

Cascadian bioregionalism deals with the connected ecological, environmental, economic, and cultural ties that are prevalent throughout the U.S. Pacific Northwest and distance the area from their eastern counterparts. The argument is that those in Washington and Oregon in the United States have much more in common with those in British Columbia, Canada, than those in Washington D.C.

The Cascadia Bioregion is also referred to as the Pacific Northwest Bioregion and encompasses all of the state of Washington, all but the southeastern corner of Idaho, and portions of Oregon, California, Nevada, Wyoming, Montana, Alaska, Yukon, and British Columbia. Bioregions are geographically based areas defined by land or soil composition, watershed, climate, flora, and fauna. The Cascadia Bioregion claims the entire watershed of the Columbia River (as far as the Continental Divide), as well as the Cascade Range from Northern California well into Canada. It's also considered to include the associated ocean and seas and their ecosystems out to the continental slope. The delineation of a bioregion has environmental stewardship as its primary goal, with the belief that political boundaries should match ecological and cultural boundaries.

The area from Vancouver, B.C. down to Portland, Oregon has been termed a megaregion by the U.S. and Canadian governments, especially along the 'Cascadian Corridor'. Megaregions are defined as areas where "boundaries begin to blur, creating a new scale of geography now known as the megaregion. These areas have interlocking economic systems, shared natural resources, and ecosystems, and common transportation systems link these population centers together. This area contains 17% of Cascadian land mass, but more than 80% of the Cascadian population. The Canada–US border is diminishing in the face of further economic, political and cultural integration with such programs as the enhanced drivers license program – which can be used to get across the Canada–US border between Washington and British Columbia.

History of Cascadian bioregionalism
The term "Cascades" was first used for the Cascades Rapids, as early as the Astor Expedition. The earliest attested use of the term for the mountain range dates to 1825, in the writings of botanist David Douglas. During geological explorations in the early 1900s the term was first applied to the region. The name 'Cascadia' was first used by the town Cascadia, Oregon that was settled in 1890 in what is now Linn County.

The name "Cascadia" was first applied to the whole geologic region by Bates McKee in his 1972 geology textbook Cascadia; the geologic evolution of the Pacific Northwest. Later the name was adopted by David McCloskey, a Seattle University sociology professor, to describe it as a bioregion. McCloskey describes Cascadia as "a land of falling waters." He notes the blending of the natural integrity and the sociocultural unity that gives Cascadia its definition.

McCloskey is the source of the proposed Cascadian boundaries that include the complete watershed of the Columbia River, including the territories of what is now Idaho, western Montana, and smaller parts of Wyoming, Utah, and northern Nevada.

According to McCloskey, this "initial" Cascadia included parts of seven jurisdictions (Northern California, Oregon, Washington, Idaho, Western Montana, British Columbia, and Southeast Alaska), running from the northernmost reaches of Southeast Alaska in the north to Cape Mendocino, California in the south–and covering all the land and "falling waters" from the continental divide at the Rocky Mountains to the Pacific Ocean. McCloskey, founder of the Cascadia Institute and co‐chair of Seattle University's New Ecological Studies Program, saw Cascadian identity as something which transcends political or geographic definitions; it is more a cultural, ideological identity.

Bioregionalism as a general principle

Because it is a cultural idea, the description of a specific bioregion is drawn using information from not only the natural sciences but also many other sources. It is a geographic terrain and a terrain of consciousness. Anthropological studies, historical accounts, social developments, customs, traditions, and arts can all play a part. Bioregionalism utilizes them to accomplish three main goals:

 restore and maintain local natural systems;
 practice sustainable ways to satisfy basic human needs such as food, water, shelter, and materials; and
 support the work of reinhabitation.

The latter is accomplished through proactive projects, employment and education, as well as by engaging in protests against the destruction of natural elements in a life-place.

Bioregional goals play out in a spectrum of different ways for different places. In North America, for example, restoring native prairie grasses is a basic ecosystem-rebuilding activity for reinhabitants of the Kansas Area Watershed Bioregion in the Midwest, whereas bringing back salmon runs has a high priority for Shasta Bioregion in northern California. Using geothermal and wind as a renewable energy source fits Cascadia Bioregion in the rainy Pacific Northwest. Less cloudy skies in the Southwest's sparsely vegetated Sonoran Desert Bioregion make direct solar energy a more plentiful alternative there. Education about local natural characteristics and conditions varies diversely from place to place, along with bioregionally significant social and political issues.

There is a strong affinity for bioregional thinking in many fields that relate to ecological sustainability.

In the early 1970s, the contemporary vision of bioregionalism began to be formed through collaboration between natural scientists, social and environmental activists, artists and writers, community leaders, and back-to-the-landers who worked directly with natural resources. They wanted to do "more than just save what's left" in regard to nature, wildness and the biosphere. During the 1970s, Planet Drum Foundation in San Francisco became a voice for this sentiment through its publications about applying place-based ideas to environmental practices, society, cultural expressions, philosophy, politics, and other subjects. By the late 70s, bioregional organizations such as the Frisco Bay Mussel Group in northern California and Ozark Area Community Congress on the Kansas-Missouri border were founded to articulate local economic, social, political, and cultural agendas. The Mussel Group eventually played a pivotal role in persuading the public to vote down a bioregionally lethal Peripheral Canal proposal to divert fresh water away from San Francisco Bay. The Ozarks group has held continuous annual gatherings to promote and support place-based activities. At present there are hundreds of similar groups (and publications) in North and South America, Europe, Japan, and Australia.

There is a strong affinity for bioregional thinking in many fields that relate to ecological sustainability. Restoration ecology practitioners readily grasp the importance of an appreciative local culture for their efforts to revive native plants and animals. Urban ecology advocates use bioregions for "nesting" their redesigned cities in a broad natural context. Permaculturalists and most organic farmers employ techniques that are appropriate to their particular locales and insist on maintaining soils, water sources, and native species. Poets, painters, theater groups, and other artists have embraced bioregional themes in their works. Grade school teachers introduce bioregional concepts, and graduate schools recognize theses and dissertations based on them. Followers of Deep Ecology claim bioregionalists as a social manifestation of their biocentric philosophy. Even traditional conservation and environmental groups including the Sierra Club have subsequent to the inception of bioregionalism adopted a system of"ecoregions" to address members' problems in home areas.

Bioregionalists are primarily concerned with their own local areas. There are a surprisingly large number of opportunities to address everyday living conditions for the benefit of local sustainability; as wide-ranging as resident-based reforestation projects in rural areas and community gardens in cities. Their influence is felt most strongly on county and city levels because this is where they take place and are most visible. Watershed-based organizations with bioregional priorities for basins as small as a creek or as large as the Great Lakes are a steadily growing phenomenon. Their recommendations to boards, councils, and other agencies aren't limited to creek restoration, water conservation, and other obvious issues, but may also include redrawing political borders to fit watershed lines and adopting ecological urban plans.

Ecoregions of Cascadia

Ecoregions are the rooms in the house of a bioregion. Ecoregion is short-hand for regional ecosystem. An ecoregion is a relatively similar area united by common geography, ecology, and culture. Ecoregions are distinct places which help articulate the internal diversity of a large and complex region such as Cascadia.

The purpose of ecoregional mapping is two-fold: one, to provide a common, integrative framework for management of natural resources, and two, for deeper social identification with the land and each other, and thus, better political organization. An ecoregion is known in two ways: internally by its distinctive character (e.g. the Okanogan Highlands), and externally by its context in the region (e.g. Okanogan in relation to the Columbia Plateau).

An ecoregion may be analyzed on physical, biological, and cultural levels. First, we map the landforms, geology, climate, and hydrology, and how these environmental factors work together to create a common template for life in that particular place. Second, we map the flora and fauna, especially the characteristic vegetative communities, and link them to their habitats. Third, we look at native peoples, western settlement, and current land-use patterns and problems, in interaction with the first two levels.

Each layer of information is brought together to represent the regional system. No one single factor (e.g. climate) explains everything. The inner structure of an ecoregion is organized as a series of intersecting gradients; temperature and precipitation changing with elevation, in alternating belts of vegetation along windward and leeward sides of a parallel series of mountain ranges, with biodiversity thinning toward the edges. Such flows of energy, matter, and information form a distinctive matrix. To understand the region, we must comprehend this system of relationships.

Boundaries are natural, and often found as soft transitional areas rather than hard-edged political lines on a map. The boundary is a convergent threshold where many layers intersect, located where several significant factors end and begin. Borders articulate the natural envelope of the place–its centers and bounds–and link this diversity into the larger world.

Since ecological systems are open and lack definite boundaries, in complex terrain, watersheds are often used to represent ecosystems on a landscape level. Here, ecoregions are often drawn as a series of contiguous watersheds with similar character and context. However, where other factors predominate–such as landforms, tectonic suites, regional rivers, vegetative breaks, or major cultural boundaries–then watershed lines may be crossed. In each case, the key is to be true to the land and its people. In terms of size, an ecoregion is larger than a watershed and smaller than a bioregion; or in political terms, larger than a county and smaller than a state or province. There are over 75 ecoregions in the more than 750,000 square miles of Cascadia. Thus, they average about 10,000 square miles each, though ranging from 2,000 to over 30,000 square miles; again, size depends upon the unique character and context of the place itself. An ecoregion in Cascadia often covers several degrees of latitude and perhaps longitude.

In politics
Cascadian bioregionalism also forms the basis for several different independence groups such as the Cascadia Bioregional Party throughout the Pacific Northwest, which base their boundaries on the bioregion of Cascadia. For more information, see Cascadia (independence movement).

See also
Ecotopia
North American inland temperate rainforest

References

External links
Dreams of a Unified Northwest Are Halted At the Border New York Times article by William Yardley, February 27, 2010.
Cascadiabioregion.org, website with extensive Cascadia related facts and figures, in popular culture, and explanations of the watershed and bioregion. 
The Cascadia Institute.org, the website belonging to Dr. David McCloskey, professor emeritus at Seattle University, and creator of both the first map of Cascadia (1988), and the newest map of Cascadia (2015), to be featured in volume 30 of the ESRI Map Book .
Free Cascadia.org, the website belonging to Alexander Baretich, designer of the Cascadian flag, and advocate of Bioregionalism.
Cascadia Bioregional Party

Ecoregions of North America

Ecoregions of Canada
Ecoregions of the United States